Ruth Seymour (born Ruth Epstein) is a retired American broadcasting executive known for her innovative work with public radio. She has been described as a pioneer in public radio and "a commanding presence in the public radio arena."

Early years 
A secular Jew, Seymour grew up in the Bronx, attending Sholem Aleichem Folk School to learn Yiddish literature and language as a supplement to her public schooling. During her years at City College of New York she studied Yiddish with Jewish linguist Max Weinreich.

Career 
Seymour's first venture into radio came at KPFK in Los Angeles from 1961 to 1964. As that station's drama and literary critic, she produced award-winning series. From 1971 to 1976, she worked as program director there, and she did freelance work for the Pacifica Foundation while traveling in Europe.

Seymour joined the staff of KCRW at Santa Monica College in 1977 as a consultant and was named manager a few months later. She retired from there in February 2009 after having helped the station "transcend its basement location to shape the culture in Los Angeles." During her tenure, the station grew from being based in a playground at a middle school and having an old transmitter to covering much of southern California with its broadcasts. It also developed streaming services and podcasts.

In 1979, two factors combined to enhance Seymour's efforts toward advancing KCRW's status. Soon after the station began using a new transmitter, National Public Radio launched Morning Edition. While the area's then-most-significant public radio station ran the two-hour program before 6 a.m., Seymour decided to run it three times each morning from 3 a.m. to 9 a.m. on KCRW. "That way nobody was going to have [the programs] when I didn't have them," she said.

Seymour spearheaded fundraising efforts for not only KCRW, including a $1 million pledge drive in 1995, but also for the network program Weekend All Things Considered in 1985 and for NPR in 1991. She also was active in the effort to simplify podcasting of radio stations' programs. Without blanket licensing agreements, such as those that apply to over-the-air broadcasts and streaming of programs, a separate contract with each record label used in the podcast was required.

Hanukah broadcast
In 1979, Seymour launched a program on KCRW that became a tradition, going strong a quarter-century later. Noting the lack of radio programming related to Hanukkah, she created and hosted Philosophers, Fiddlers and Fools, a program that included recordings of Yiddish folk music and songs from Yiddish music halls, a short story by a Yiddish author, and a memorial to the Holocaust. Initially surprised and disappointed because only two people called the station during the broadcast, Seymour thought that it was a failure — until it ended. Then calls kept the staff and their telephones busy for three hours. Thereafter, the show was broadcast annually.

Personal life 
Seymour married—and divorced -- Jack Hirschman. They had two children. After the divorce, she changed her surname to Seymour to honor her paternal grandfather, who had been a rabbi.

Recognition
In 1999, the Workmen’s Circle gave Seymour its Yiddishkayt Award for her “service to Yiddish language and culture.”

References 
 

American radio executives
City College of New York alumni
Year of birth missing (living people)
Living people
People from the Bronx